Chionanthus lucens grows as a tree up to  tall, with a trunk diameter of up to . The bark is whitish. The flowers are light green or yellow. Habitat is mixed dipterocarp forest from sea level to  altitude. C. lucens is found in Peninsular Malaysia and Borneo.

References

lucens
Plants described in 1981
Trees of Peninsular Malaysia
Trees of Borneo